is a Japanese politician and the current governor of Aichi Prefecture.

Overviews 

He was a former member of the Liberal Democratic Party, also a member of the House of Representatives in the Diet (national legislature). A native of Hekinan and graduate of the University of Tokyo, he joined the Ministry of Agriculture, Forestry and Fisheries in 1982. He was elected to the House of Representatives for the first time in 1996. He was defeated in the 2009 election by DPJ candidate Kensuke Ōnishi.

References

External links
 Official website in Japanese.

1960 births
Living people
People from Hekinan
Members of the House of Representatives from Aichi Prefecture
Liberal Democratic Party (Japan) politicians
University of Tokyo alumni
Japanese government officials
Governors of Aichi Prefecture
21st-century Japanese politicians